Juan Josué Rodríguez (born 16 January 1988) is a Honduran football midfielder who plays for Parrillas One.

Career

Club 
Nicknamed El Rambo, Rodríguez start his career in 2007 at Olimpia Occidental from the Liga Nacional de Ascenso de Honduras. Then, in 2012 he move to Parrillas One and his team was promoted to the Liga Nacional de Honduras a year later.

International 
He made his debut for the national side on 10 September 2014 in a match against Guatemala for the 2014 Copa Centroamericana (0–2 loss). He has represented his country at 2014 Copa Centroamericana and in some friendly matches.

Honours 
 Parrillas One
Liga Nacional de Ascenso de Honduras: 2013 Clausura
 Marathón
Liga Profesional de Honduras: 2017–18 C
Honduran Cup: 2017

References

External links 
 
 Juan Josué Rodríguez at playmakerstats.com (English version of ceroacero.es)

1988 births
Living people
Honduran footballers
Honduras international footballers
Association football forwards
Parrillas One players
Liga Nacional de Fútbol Profesional de Honduras players
People from Copán Department
2014 Copa Centroamericana players